is an epic historical dark fantasy/science fiction work; the debut novel of natural history researcher and polymath Hiroshi Aramata. It began circulation in the literary magazine Monthly King Novel owned by Kadokawa Shoten in 1983, and was published in 10 volumes over the course of 1985–1987.  The novel is a romanticized retelling of the 20th-century history of Tokyo from an occultist perspective.

Widely regarded as the first mainstream novel to popularize onmyōdō and fūsui mythology in modern Japanese fiction, the work was a major success in its native country.  It won the 1987 Nihon SF Taisho Award, sold over 5 million copies in Japan alone, inspired several adaptations as well as a long running literary franchise.  Likewise its influence can still be felt to this day.

Overview
The work is a re-imagining of the 20th century of Tokyo as influenced by the occult.  Most of the subject matter builds upon references to classic Japanese and Chinese folklore, although the centerpiece of the mythology is the legend of Taira no Masakado, a 10th-century warlord and ferocious onryo who was placated into a guardian kami through centuries of worship.

The plot features many characters, both historical and fictional.  Most of the narrative revolves around the cryptohistorical actions of Yasunori Katō, a mysterious former lieutenant of the Imperial Japanese Army who is himself a vengeful oni; a descendant of the people who rebelled against the Japanese Empire in ancient times. With an incredible knowledge of the supernatural and allies in China, Korea and Taiwan; Katō dedicates his life to crippling Tokyo, the seat of power of the modern Japanese Empire. His ruinous ambitions bring him into conflict with some of 20th century Japan's greatest minds including industrialist Eiichi Shibusawa, onmyoji Abe no Seimei's descendant Yasumasa Hirai, authors Koda Rohan and Izumi Kyoka; physicist Torahiko Terada, and author Yukio Mishima.  The resulting conflict, involving science, magic and politics; spans 90 years of Japan's history.

The story begins near the end of the Meiji period and ranges through the rest of the century. It reinvents major events such as the Great Kantō earthquake, the founding of Japan's first subway, the February 26 Incident, the firebombing raids, the signing of the 1960 US Security Pact, and the ritual suicide of Yukio Mishima. The narrative finally reaches its climax in 1998, the 73rd year of a fictional Shōwa period.

List of characters
The historical characters who play primary or supporting roles in the story include:

Taira no Masakado
Tachibana no Hayanari
Aterui
Tōyama Kagemoto
Hirata Atsutane
Hijikata Toshizō
Ichimura Tetsunosuke
Enomoto Takeaki
Edward and Henry Schnell
Prince Sawara
Sugawara no Michizane
Thomas Blakiston
Kōda Rohan
Satō Nobuhiro
Joseph Needham
Mori Ōgai
Torahiko Terada
Hantaro Nagaoka
Karl Haushofer
Shoma Morita
Makoto Nishimura
Gakutensoku
Shibusawa Eiichi
Kyōka Izumi
Akiko Yosano
Masatoshi Ōkōchi
Noritsugu Hayakawa
Wajiro Kon
Goto Shinpei
Korekiyo Takahashi
Kanji Nakajima
Ikki Kita
Puyi
Kanji Ishiwara
Hideki Tojo
Ōtani Kōzui
Franklin D. Roosevelt
Shūmei Ōkawa
Masahiko Amakasu
Hisaya Morishige
Yukio Mishima
George Gurdjieff
Fusako Shigenobu
Kadokawa Gen'yoshi
Haruki Kadokawa

Volumes
The tenth volume of the novel, published in 1987, was originally intended to be the final volume. However, when the novel was republished in 1987–1989, additional eleventh and twelfth volumes were also written to supplement more of the story around 1945, the end of World War II. When the novel was republished in 1995, volumes 11 and 12 were inserted in the chronologically appropriate spot between volumes 5 and 6.

Vol. 1: 
Vol. 2: 
Vol. 3: 
Vol. 4: 
Vol. 5: 
Vol. 6: 
Vol. 7: 
Vol. 8: 
Vol. 9: 
Vol. 10: 
Vol. 11: 
Vol. 12:

List of publications
10 volumes, 1985–1987, cover art by Suehiro Maruo
12 volumes, 1987–1989, cover art by Yoshitaka Amano
6 volumes, 1995, cover art by Shou Tajima (this is the edition currently in print)

Concept and creation
The novel originally served as a minor side project for Hiroshi Aramata who, at the time, was focused on gathering materials for an upcoming natural history book he planned to publish.  He was asked by the editor in chief of Kadokawa Shoten, Hiroshi Morinaga, to produce a fantasy themed work for their periodical Monthly King Novel.   At that time, Aramata had never written a fictional novel before.  The initial idea for the story came from the legend of Taira no Masakado.  Aramata was fascinated by the legacy of his spirit and its superstitious impact on modern Japan.

In addition, while participating in the creation of Heibonsha World Encyclopedia, Hiroshi Aramata was inspired by discussions with anthropologist Komatsu Kazuhiko about sources of the strange and the mysterious in Japanese folklore.  Around the same time, Aramata also read Murayama Shinichi's non fiction history of onmyodo Nihon Onmyodoshi Sosetsu.

Legacy
Teito Monogatari, the novel and its various adaptations, is widely credited with pioneering a number of folklore tropes in popular Japanese fantasy media such as onmyodo, Feng shui, shikigami, kodoku, shijie, gohō dōji and Kimon Tonkou.  Likewise it helped spark a surge of real life subcultural interest in these topics across the nation.  The success of Teito Monogatari inspired Baku Yumemakura to begin writing his Onmyoji novel series; a best-selling franchise which heavily influenced mainstream interest in onmyoji mysticism across Japan and the international scene.  Other similarly themed franchises which emerged in the wake of the novel's success include Clamp's Tokyo Babylon manga series, and  Natsuhiko Kyogoku's Kyōgokudō (京極堂) series.

Professor of human geography Paul Waley cites Teito Monogatari as a work that reminded a generation of general Japanese readers about Tokyo's former status as an imperial capital.  Dr. Noriko T. Reider, associate professor of Japanese Studies at Miami University, credits Teito Monogatari with raising "the oni's status and popularity greatly in modern times". In 2009 Higashi Masao, a notable authority in the field of Japanese weird fiction, wrote an article entitled "The Impact of Teito Monogatari" where he discussed the novel's influence on contemporary Japanese supernatural fiction. Akira Okawada, a specialist in Japanese science fiction literature, wrote a similar article in 2010 discussing the work's influence on that respective genre.

Analysis
In her essay "Oni and Japanese Identity", Dr. Noriko T. Reider argues that the work is a heterotopic inversion of classical oni mythology heavily influenced by the supernatural configuration brought about by World War II. She describes the novel as a "...heterotopic site where...contemporary representations of oni reflect past representations, where oni of the past are not simply superimposed upon the present but both act as extensions of each other in an odd continuum". The character of Yasunori Kato is intended as a homage to classic heroes from Japanese folklore such as Minamoto no Raiko (an imperial soldier related to oni) and Abe no Seimei. Whereas those heroes were ardent defenders and valuable servants of the Empire though, Kato is presented as its worst possible enemy. This inversion is also reflected in the character of Taira no Masakado, whom at the beginning is demonized by the narrator and the Japanese government as a national rebel and a threat. However, the story unfolds with him in the role of Tokyo's benevolent guardian deity worshiped by the various protectors of the city. The negative association becomes a positive one. Another example is found in the novel's fictional version of Emperor Hirohito. In pre-war Japanese culture, the Emperor was regarded as a divine figure incapable of human failing. In Teito Monogatari however, the Showa Emperor is presented as a frail figure who prolongs his life by unwittingly ingesting a nostrum made from human organs. This practice of cannibalism effectively puts him on the level of oni, a major paradox since the Emperor's divine status and the status of oni are incompatible with each other. If even the Emperor of Japan has the potential to become an oni, then when is an oni not an oni?

Spin-offs and prequels
The  series: Published 1993–2001. A multi-volume series starring Tatsuto Kuroda, the grandson of the feng shui expert Shigemaru Kuroda from Teito Monogatari, as he struggles against various spiritual disturbances across Japan. The fourth volume of this series was made into an independent tokusatsu film titled , released in 1997.
: Published 1995. A spin-off of the main story, set in 1998. The film  (1995) is loosely based on it.
: Republished 2007–2011. A prequel to the original novel, set during the Edo period. Illustrations by Shigeru Mizuki, with an introduction by Natsuhiko Kyogoku.
: Published 2001, republished in 2009. A follow-up to Teito Gendan, set during the Bakumatsu.
: Published 2001. The "secret origins" of Yasunori Katō. This collection features the writings of a multitude of Japanese authors.
: A 2005 fantasy film by Takashi Miike. Yasunori Katō leads an army of twisted yōkai on an invasion of Tokyo. Was made in cooperation with Hiroshi Aramata (who wrote the novel), Shigeru Mizuki and Natsuhiko Kyogoku.
: A 2021 fantasy film by Takashi Miike.  Sequel to the above film.

Adaptations

Stage
A humorous stage adaptation of the novel was performed by the Tokyo Grand Guignol Theater in the mid-1980s. It is most notable for introducing the talents of its star Kyūsaku Shimada, the actor who would become most associated with the image of the protagonist Yasunori Kato in future film adaptations.

Manga
, illustrated by Kamui Fujiwara, published by Kadokawa Shoten in 1987 and republished in 1999. A visual adaptation of books 1–4.
, illustrated by Yōsuke Takahashi, published by Dragon Comics in 1989 and republished by Kadokawa Shoten in 2008. A visual adaptation of "Advent of the Devil" (book 5) and "Great War in the Capital" (book 6, formerly book 11).
It is currently unavailable in book form.

Film
Tokyo: The Last Megalopolis (1988)
Tokyo: The Last War (1989)
Doomed Megalopolis (1991)

In 1988, a cinematic adaptation of the same name, adapting the first four volumes of the novel, was released by Toho Studios. The film received positive critical reception and was a commercial success, becoming one of the top ten highest grossing domestic movies of that year. The movie was eventually distributed to Western markets under the title Tokyo: The Last Megalopolis

The success of this adaptation prompted the production of a sequel, Tokyo: The Last War (1989), loosely based on the 11th book, Great War in the Capital.

In 1991, the first cinematic adaptation was remade into a four-part OVA anime of the same name produced by Madhouse. The anime was adapted to the US by Streamline Pictures under the title Doomed Megalopolis in 1995. Although the plot of the anime loosely parallels the original story, the production is renowned for being darker and more provocative than its source material or any other adaptation preceding it.

Video games
: A survival horror title published in 1999 by Bee Factory, Inc. Although marketed under the title Teito Monogatari, it is actually an adaptation of the Sim-Feng Shui series.

See also
Musubi no Yama Hiroku: Another classic historical fantasy novel with a similar premise by renowned science fiction author Ryō Hanmura.
The Sea of Fertility: Yukio Mishima's character arc in Teito Monogatari is modeled on this classic tetralogy.

References

External links
 Outline of the novels
 Catalog of books at Kadokawa Shoten.co.jp

1985 fantasy novels
1985 Japanese novels
Dark fantasy novels
Historical fantasy novels
Japanese fantasy novels
Monogatari
Novels set in Tokyo
Sequel novels
Works about earthquakes
1923 Great Kantō earthquake